"Simpson Tide" is the nineteenth episode of the ninth season of the American animated television series The Simpsons. It originally aired on the Fox network in the United States on March 29, 1998. After being fired from the Springfield Nuclear Power Plant, Homer decides to join the U.S. Naval Reserve. The episode was the second and last to be written by Joshua Sternin and Jennifer Ventimilia and was the final episode directed by Milton Gray.

It guest-starred Rod Steiger as Captain Tenille and Bob Denver as himself, with one-time The Simpsons writer Michael Carrington making an appearance as the Drill Sergeant. This was the last episode Al Jean and Mike Reiss executive produced together, although Jean became showrunner again in season 13.

Plot
After Homer nearly causes the nuclear plant to go into meltdown by putting a doughnut into the reactor core to enlarge it, he is fired by Mr. Burns. While at home he sees a recruitment advertisement on television for the Naval Reserve and decides to enlist, with Moe, Barney, and Apu deciding to join him. Meanwhile, Bart purchases an earring, which an outraged Homer confiscates.

Homer and the others are placed on a nuclear submarine. While participating in a military exercise, Homer unintentionally has the captain fired out of a torpedo tube and pilots the submarine into Russian waters, which is seen by the United States government as an attempt to defect. This event creates a political schism between the USA and Russia, leading to the revelation that the Soviet Union in fact never truly dissolved, complete with the Berlin Wall rising from the ground, Soviet troops and tanks appearing on the streets and Vladimir Lenin rising from his tomb in Moscow.

Nuclear war is anticipated until the US Navy drops depth charges on Homer's sub, aiming either to destroy it or force it to surface. The consequent explosion causes a pinhole leak in the submarine's hull, but Homer uses Bart's earring to plug the leak and saves the submarine. The vessel surfaces and Homer is taken to be court-martialed, but the officers on the review committee have themselves been indicted on unrelated charges, and Homer's punishment ends up being a mild dishonorable discharge and he immediately forgives Bart, as the earring saved his life.

Production

"Simpson Tide" was one of two season nine episodes that was executive produced by Al Jean and Mike Reiss, who together were the showrunners for the third and fourth seasons. Although Jean would later return to run the show the following season, it was the last episode for which Reiss received an executive producer credit. Joshua Sternin and Jennifer Ventimilia, the episode writers, were working on Jean and Reiss's show The Critic at the time, and pitched an episode where Homer joins the Naval Reserve. Although the episode is partly based on the film Crimson Tide, the original episode pitch was made before the film was released. After the release of the film, the writers decided to start incorporating things from the movie in the script. In the original draft, Bart sneaked on board the submarine with Homer. They were trying to do it "for the comedy of it", but could not get the draft to work, so it was cut. It was difficult for them to figure out how to get the captain off of the sub and they eventually decided to have him shot out of the torpedo tube, which in the DVD commentary, Al Jean says that Steiger claimed that he really did get stuck in a torpedo tube once.

The Navy drill instructor, along with the announcer to "Exploitation Theater", was voiced by Michael Carrington, who had written the season four episode "Homer's Triple Bypass" and previously voiced Sideshow Raheem. Bob Denver voices himself in the episode and was directed by Mike Reiss. Rod Steiger guest stars as the captain and was directed by Al Jean.

Cultural references

Many parts of the episode, including the title, refer to the 1995 film Crimson Tide. The captain of the submarine is based on Captain Frank Ramsey, a character in the film who was portrayed by Gene Hackman.  Homer mentions that he and his friends joining the Navy is similar to The Deer Hunter, and the Russian roulette scene from the film is later parodied. Right before the submarine submerges, the song "In the Navy" is played and the Village People can be seen dancing.  The Captain of the submarine is named Captain Tenille a reference to the musical duo Captain & Tenille. When aboard the submarine, Homer refers to one of the crew members as Mr. Sulu, a reference to the Star Trek character. Lisa says she is opposed to the Military Industrial Complex, a term popularized by President Eisenhower. When Homer is at the Naval recruitment center the recruiter doesn't want him to read a certain question this is because of the Don't ask, don't tell law that was instituted under President Clinton. 

The opening couch gag is a recreation of the Rocky and Bullwinkle animated bumper seen at the end of each Bullwinkle short. The music accompanying it is also adapted from the original music in the bumper. In the opening scene, Homer dreams of being on "the planet of the doughnuts" and on a criminal trial similar to that from the film Planet of the Apes. One of the five Naval officers was unable to indict Homer due to his involvement in the Tailhook scandal.

Bart sings a portion of the song "Do the Bartman" and Ralph Wiggum comments that it "is so 1991", which was when the music video for the song was released. Grampa Simpson claims that he attacked John F. Kennedy on the PT-109 when Kennedy stated "Ich bin ein Berliner", leading to Grampa mistaking him for a Nazi.

Russia-Ukraine crisis "prediction" 
In 2014, it was alleged that the episode's Soviet Union revival joke predicted the recent Russian annexation of Crimea from Ukraine. Following the Russian invasion of Ukraine in February 2022, rumors began spreading that the joke also predicted that this war between Russia and Ukraine, both of which were previously part of the Soviet Union, would happen. In an interview with Hollywood Reporter, Simpsons showrunner Al Jean responded to the prediction rumors by claiming that now 24-year-old gag was “very sad” and that “There is the kind of prediction, where we reference something that has happened, happening again — we hope it wouldn’t, but sadly, it does.” In addition to the ordering the Russian military invasion of Ukraine, Russian leader Vladimir Putin, who Jean blamed for the rising tensions, has also previous made efforts to intervene in the affairs of other former Soviet republics as well, with another example being 2008 Russian invasion of Georgia. Jean also stated on his Twitter account "Very sad to say this was not hard to predict."

Reception
In its original broadcast, "Simpson Tide" finished 29th in ratings for the week of March 23–29, 1998, with a Nielsen rating of 9.2, equivalent to approximately 9.0 million viewing households. It was the second highest-rated show on the Fox network that week, following The X-Files.

Michael Schiffer, one of the writers of the film Crimson Tide, is said to have enjoyed this episode. Mike Reiss considers the sequence where Russia returns to being the Soviet Union to be "the nuttiest the show has ever been". The authors of the book I Can't Believe It's a Bigger and Better Updated Unofficial Simpsons Guide, Warren Martyn and Adrian Wood, called it "a fairly straightforward episode where the biggest laugh comes from Homer being able to talk to penguins and Bart trying to impress his classmates by doing The Bartman."

References

External links

The Simpsons (season 9) episodes
1998 American television episodes
Television episodes about communism
Berlin Wall in fiction
Television episodes set in Moscow
Television episodes set in Russia
Television episodes set in the Soviet Union
Cultural depictions of Vladimir Lenin
Cultural depictions of John F. Kennedy
Cultural depictions of the Village People
Television episodes about the Cold War